Bel Canto is a 2018 American drama film directed by Paul Weitz, from a screenplay by Weitz and Anthony Weintraub. It is based on the 2001 novel of the same name by Ann Patchett. It stars Julianne Moore, Ken Watanabe, Sebastian Koch, and Christopher Lambert.

It was released on September 14, 2018 by Screen Media Films.

Synopsis
Roxane Coss, a famous American soprano, travels to South America to give a private concert at the birthday party of rich Japanese industrialist Katsumi Hosokawa. Just as a handsome gathering of local dignitaries convenes at Vice-President Ruben Ochoa's mansion, including French Ambassador Thibault and his wife, Hosokawa's faithful translator Gen, and Russian trade delegate Fyodorov, the house is taken over by guerrillas led by Comandante Benjamin demanding the release of their imprisoned comrades. Their only contact with the outside world is through Red Cross negotiator Messner. A month-long standoff ensues in which hostages and captors must overcome their differences and find their shared humanity and hope in the face of impending disaster.

Cast and characters
Julianne Moore as Roxane Coss (Renée Fleming as her singing "voice")
Ken Watanabe as Katsumi Hosokawa
Sebastian Koch as Joachim Messner
Christopher Lambert as Simon Thibault
Ryo Kase as Gen Watanabe
Tenoch Huerta as Comandante Benjamin
María Mercedes Coroy as Carmen
Olek Krupa as Fyodorov
 Gabo Augustine as Ismael
Elsa Zylberstein as Edith Thibault
J. Eddie Martinez as Ruben
Bobby Daniel Rodriguez as Father Arguedas
Nico Bustamante as Ruben's son Marco
Jay Santiago as Monsignor Rolland

Production
In August 2016, it was announced that Julianne Moore, Ken Watanabe and Demián Bichir joined the cast of the film, with Paul Weitz directing, from a screenplay he wrote alongside Anthony Weintraub, based upon the novel of the same name. Caroline Baron, Weintraub, Weitz and Andrew Miano will serve as producers on the film, under their A-Line Pictures and Depth of Field banners, respectively. In February 2017, Sebastian Koch, Christopher Lambert, Elsa Zylberstein joined the cast of the film. Renée Fleming joined the films as Moore's singing voice. It was later revealed María Mercedes Coroy joined the cast of the film.

Principal photography began in New York on February 13, 2017.

Release
In May 2018, Screen Media Films acquired U.S. distribution rights to the film. It was released on September 14, 2018. The website's critics consensus reads: "Bel Cantos reach occasionally exceeds its ambitious grasp in terms of juggling themes and tones, but it's held together by palpable emotion and a pair of strong leads."

See also
Japanese embassy hostage crisis

References

External links
 
 

2018 films
2018 thriller drama films
American thriller drama films
Films about businesspeople
Films about diplomats
Films about hostage takings
Films about opera
Films about singers
Films based on American novels
Films directed by Paul Weitz
Films set in South America
Films with screenplays by Paul Weitz
2018 drama films
2010s English-language films
2010s American films